Aninoasa is  a commune in Dâmbovița County, Muntenia, Romania. It is composed of three villages: Aninoasa, Săteni and Viforâta. It is situated in the historical region of Muntenia.

The commune has two monasteries, Dealu Monastery and Viforâta Monastery. Its name is derived from "Anin", a Romanian word for the Alder tree.

References

Communes in Dâmbovița County
Localities in Muntenia